Marmara ischnotoma is a moth of the family Gracillariidae. It is found in Guyana.

References

Gracillariinae
Moths described in 1915